James Brice (August 26, 1746 – July 11, 1801) was an American planter, lawyer, and politician from Annapolis, Maryland. He was Governor of Maryland in 1792, and one of the largest land owners on the east coast.

James was born in Annapolis and was the son of John Brice, Jr. and Sarah Frisby Brice. He practiced law in Annapolis and married Juliana Jennings in 1781. The couple would have five children: Julia, Anne, Elizabeth, James, Thomas, John.

Brice began his political career as tax commissioner for the county and as an alderman in Annapolis. In 1777 he became a member of the Maryland Governor's Council, a post he held until 1799. As the senior member of the council, Brice became acting governor when Governor George Plater died on February 10, 1792. He stepped down after Thomas Sim Lee was elected and sworn in on April 2.

Brice also served as Mayor of Annapolis in 1782-1783 and again in 1787-1788. He represented Maryland as a Presidential Elector twice, both times voting for George Washington. He served as treasurer for the city of Annapolis from 1784 until his death.

James died in Annapolis, and was survived by his wife Juliana and all five children; who left and settled in Topping, Virginia. The last known family members are Judge James Brice and Jimmy Brice of Roanoke, Virginia. Jimmy Brice's son James Brice III is the last male in the Brice family residing in Virginia Beach, Virginia.

References

1746 births
1801 deaths
Governors of Maryland
Mayors of Annapolis, Maryland
American planters
Maryland Federalists
Federalist Party state governors of the United States
People of colonial Maryland
American slave owners